Benny Nielsen (12 April 1934 – 26 September 1994) was a Danish boxer. He competed in the men's welterweight event at the 1960 Summer Olympics.

References

External links
 

1934 births
1994 deaths
Danish male boxers
Olympic boxers of Denmark
Boxers at the 1960 Summer Olympics
Sportspeople from Copenhagen
Welterweight boxers